Flat Rock is an unincorporated community in Jackson County, Alabama, United States. The Flat Rock post office was established in 1912.

Geography
Flat Rock is located on top of Sand Mountain.

t I

Major Highways
 State Route 71
 State Route 117

Demographics
As of the census of 2010, there were 3,914 people. The population density was 117.5 persons per square mile.  The racial makeup of the town was 94.9% White, and 3.3% from two or more races. 1.2% of the population were Hispanic or Latino of any race.

In Flat Rock the population was spread out, with 23.6% under the age of 18 and 14.7% who were 65 years of age or older. Marriage status: 18.9% never married, 61.4% now married, 8.1% widowed, and 11.6% divorced.

The per capita income for Flat Rock was $16,748. About 13.2% of the population were below the poverty line.

Education 
Flat Rock is home to Flat Rock Elementary School (grades K - 8), which is part of the Jackson County School System.

References

External links 
 http://flatrock.jce.schoolinsites.com/ 
 https://digitalalabama.com/best-small-towns-in-alabama/flat-rock-alabama/46275 |Best Small Towns in Alabama

Unincorporated communities in Jackson County, Alabama
Unincorporated communities in Alabama